GrillGrill (stylized as GR†LLGR†LL) is a witch house producer and artist based in Denmark. His untitled debut album was released on Houston-based label Disaro in March 2010. Alongside Salem and Mater Suspiria Vision, GrillGrill is regarded as one of the pioneers of the witch house genre and visual aesthetics.

Discography

Albums
 Untitled (CDr, 2010, Disaro)

Other
 Split (7" vinyl split with Horse MacGyver, 2010, Bad Sound)
 GR†LLGR†LL (digital, 2011, self-released)
 For You (Macedonien Edits) (digital, 2011, self-released)
 ... (digital, 2011, self-released)

References

Danish producers